The Valea Lungă is a right tributary of the river Târnava Mare in Romania. It flows into the Târnava Mare in the village Valea Lungă.

References

Rivers of Romania
Rivers of Alba County